The 2020–21 Fortuna Düsseldorf season was the club's 126th season in existence and the first season back in the second flight of German football. In addition to the domestic league, Fortuna Düsseldorf participated in this season's edition of the DFB-Pokal. The season covered the period from 1 July 2020 to 30 June 2021.

Review and events
Fortuna Düsseldorf started the 2020–21 season on 12 September 2020 against FC Ingolstadt 04 in the first round of the DFB-Pokal. Fortuna Düsseldorf won the match 1–0 against FC Ingolstadt 04. However, they were knocked out of the DFB–Pokal in the following round against Rot-Weiss Essen.

The first 2. Bundesliga match happened against Hamburger SV on 18 September 2020. Fortuna Düsseldorf lost the match 2–1. Fortuna Düsseldorf's first league win came on 20 September 2020 against Würzburger Kickers. Fortuna Düsseldorf won 1–0. They finished September in 11th place. In October, they went on a three–match winless streak before winning the final match of the month. They lost matchday 3 and 5 against Holstein Kiel and Hannover 96 they drew matchday four 2–2 against Jahn Regensburg, and won matchday six against 1. FC Heidenheim. Fortuna Düsseldorf finished October tied for 12th place with SV Sandhausen. on 30 November 2020, Fortuna Düsseldorf lost to VfL Bochum 5–0. Fortuna Düsseldorf finished November in 12th place. Fortuna Düsseldorf won all four league matches in December. Fortuna Düsseldorf defeated SV Darmstadt 98, Karlsruher SC, VfL Osnabrück, and FC St. Pauli. Fortuna Düsseldorf finished December in fifth place. Fortuna Düsseldorf started 2021 with a win against SC Paderborn 07. This was their fifth win in a row. Their five–match winning streak finished when they drew Eintracht Braunschweig 0–0. A victory against Erzgebirge Aue on 16 January 2021 (matchday 16) put Fortuna Düsseldorf in third place for a playoff for promotion to the 2021–22 Bundesliga season. However, a draw against Greuther Fürth on 22 January 2021 (matchday 17) dropped Fortuna Düsseldorf down to fourth place and a 0–0 draw against Hamburg on 26 February 2021 (matchday 18) dropped Fortuna Düsseldorf down to fifth place. Fortuna Düsseldorf finished January with a 2–1 loss to Würzburger Kickers on 29 January 2021. Fortuna Düsseldorf finished January in sixth place. This was Fortuna Düsseldorf's first loss since losing 5–0 to Bochum.

Pre-season and friendlies

Competitions

Overview

Bundesliga

League table

Results summary

Results by round

Matches
The league fixtures were announced on 7 August 2020.

DFB-Pokal

Player details

First-team squad

Transfers

Out on loan

Notes

References

External links

Fortuna Düsseldorf seasons
Fortuna Düsseldorf